Crosio may refer to:
Janice Crosio (born 1939), Australian politician
Luigi Crosio (1835–1915), Italian painter
Crosio della Valle, Lombardy, Italy
Croce family, based in Dubrovnik, Republic of Ragusa